RxNorm is short for medical prescription normalized

RxNorm is US-specific terminology in medicine that contains all medications available on the US market. It can also be used in personal health records applications. RxNorm is part of Unified Medical Language System (UMLS) terminology and is maintained by the United States National Library of Medicine (NLM).

Concept types
RxNorm distinguishes different types of drug concepts. It has concepts for drug ingredients, clinical drugs or dose forms.

Coverage 
RxNorm only includes drugs that are approved in USA.

Use
 NLM provides six APIs related to RxNorm. There is also a web application called RxMix that allows users to access the RxNorm APIs without writing their own programs.

See also 
 Anatomical Therapeutic Chemical Classification System

References

External links 

National Institutes of Health
Pharmacological classification systems